Mikhail Pavlov (September 1, 1952 – June 6, 2010) was a Belarusian statesman, and was Mayor of Minsk.

Biography
He graduated from a secondary school Mahiliou, Machine-Building Institute and the Academy of National Economy by the Government of Russian Federation. He has specialized as an engineer-technician for welding equipment and technologies and manager of higher qualification.

He started working as an electric welder in Valozhyn region. After serving in the army, for ten years he headed several big machine-building enterprises in the city of Baranovichi as a general manager and he was elected to the post of the Mayor of Baranovichi in 1997. He was elected into Council of the Republic of Belarus of the National Assembly of Belarus twice, in 2000 and 2004.

He was the Chairman of Minsk City Executive Committee (mayor) from March 28, 2000 until his death.

He was married, and is survived by a daughter.

References

External links
Biography, Minsk City Executive Committee

1952 births
2010 deaths
Mayors of Minsk
People from Shklow District
Members of the Council of the Republic of Belarus
Members of the House of Representatives of Belarus